Roque Peréz Partido is a partido of Buenos Aires Province in Argentina.

External links

 
Federal website

1913 establishments in Argentina
Partidos of Buenos Aires Province
Populated places established in 1913